Słonecznik may refer to:

 Słonecznik, Polish word for Helianthus
 Słonecznik, Ostróda County, a village in Warmian-Masurian Voivodeship, Poland
 Słonecznik, Szczytno County, a village in Warmian-Masurian Voivodeship, Poland
 Słonecznik (rock), a standalone prominent rock in the Krkonoše mountains